Avice Maud Bowbyes (29 May 1901–29 December 1992) was a New Zealand home science lecturer and writer. She was born in Kaikoura, Marlborough, New Zealand on 29 May 1901.

References

1901 births
1992 deaths
New Zealand educators
New Zealand academics
New Zealand writers
New Zealand women writers
People from Kaikōura